Sarcina is a pack carried by Roman legionnaires.

Sarcina may also refer to:
Sarcina (bacterium), a genus of Gram-positive bacteria
Dentarene sarcina, a species of sea snail, also referred as the spiny wheel shellLeotropa sarcina'', a species of snout moth

Antonia Sarcina (born 1963), Italian pianist and composer
Francesco Sarcina, an Italian rock singer